The Drama Desk Award for Outstanding Revue is an annual award presented by Drama Desk in recognition of achievements in the theatre among Broadway, Off Broadway and Off-Off Broadway productions. The category was established beginning with the 1990-91 season, originally titled Musical Revue-Entertainment.

Winners and nominees

1990s

2000s

2010s

References

External links
 Drama Desk official website

Revue